The 2021 Durham, North Carolina mayoral election was held on November 2, 2021, to elect the next mayor of Durham, North Carolina.

Mayor Steve Schewel was elected with 59.5 percent of the vote in 2017 and reelected with 83.4 percent in 2019. On May 27, 2021, Schewel announced that he would not seek a third term. Seven candidates filed to run in this election to succeed Schewel as mayor.

Schewel endorsed city council member Javiera Caballero to be his successor. Durham's longest-serving mayor, Bill Bell, endorsed former superior court judge Elaine O'Neal. Caballero and O'Neal were considered the two frontrunners in the election.

A nonpartisan blanket primary was held on October 5, 2021. The top two candidates from the primary, Elaine O'Neal and Javiera Caballero, advanced to the general election ballot. O'Neal garnered 84.6% of the vote in the general election, thus becoming mayor.

Candidates

Declared
 Rebecca Barnes
 Javiera Caballero, member of the Durham City Council since 2018
 Bree Davis, research coordinator at the University of North Carolina at Chapel Hill
 Jahnmaud Lane
 Elaine O'Neal, former superior court judge and former interim dean at the North Carolina Central University School of Law
 Daryl Quick

Withdrew
 Charlitta Burruss, advocate and candidate for city council in 2019 (remained on ballot)

Declined
 Steve Schewel, mayor since 2017

Endorsements

Results

Notes

References

External links
 Bree Davis campaign website 
 Jahnmaud Lane campaign website 
 Elaine O'Neal campaign website

Durham, North Carolina
Mayoral elections in Durham, North Carolina
2021 North Carolina elections